The FIL European Luge Championships 1914 took place in Reichenberg, Bohemia (then under Austria-Hungary, now Liberec, Czech Republic) under the auspices of the Internationaler Schlittensportsverband (ISSV - International Sled Sports Federation in ), a forerunner to the International Luge Federation.

Men's singles

Women's singles

Only the gold medalist was listed in the bsd.de reference shown in the References section below. The Women's race war not officially part of the European Luge Championships 1914, but were held at the samo occasion as Meisterschaft der österreichischen Sudetenländer (Championship of the Austrian Sudetenland). There were also held a mixed doubles event, won by Wera Czernin and O. Weißenstein.

Doubles

The silver medalist pair of Kauschka and Gfäller are the only time in the championships' history where the medal winners were not from the same nation. However, it was not representatives of national associations that started at these championships, but individual starters. Thus, a greater mix among the drivers was possible.

Medal table

References

https://web.archive.org/web/20110718204018/http://bsd-portal.de/index.php?id=381&cHash=0e8470ad29&tx_ttnews[tt_news]=1241 European Luge Champions: 1914–53.  - accessed 8 February 2010.
FIL-Luge.org list of European luge champions  - Accessed January 31, 2008.
Men's doubles European champions
Men's singles European champions

FIL European Luge Championships
1914 in luge
1914 in Austria-Hungary
International sports competitions hosted by Austria-Hungary
20th century in Bohemia
Liberec